Golabundan-e Olya (also Romanized as Golābūndān-e ‘Olyā; also known as Golāvandān-e ‘Olyā) is a village in Qaleh Tall Rural District, in the Central District of Bagh-e Malek County, Khuzestan Province, Iran. At the 2006 census, its population was 107, in 19 families.

References 

Populated places in Bagh-e Malek County